Welsh Women's Aid is the national charity in Wales in the area of domestic violence and other forms of violence against women. The charity was founded in 1978 as an offshoot of the original UK federation of Women's Aid, as an equivalent body to the Women's Aid Federation of England (which continued to be known simply as Women's Aid), Scottish Women's Aid in Scotland and the Women's Aid Federation [of] Northern Ireland. It coordinates, influences and campaigns for effective responses and supports a network of Women's Aid services across Wales, delivering support including refuge, counselling and outreach at a local level.

References

Women's organisations based in Wales
Charities based in Wales
Violence against women in Wales